The Motorsports Hall of Fame of America (MSHFA) is hall of fame that honors motorsports competitors and contributors from the United States from all disciplines, with categories for Open Wheel, Stock Cars, Powerboats, Drag Racing, Motorcycles, Sports Cars, Aviation, At Large and Historic.  Periodic recognition is given to specialty categories including Off Road, Speed Records, Business and Technology. Its annual Induction Ceremony is attended by notables throughout the motorsports community and is reported on widely.

History
The MSHFA was incorporated in 1986 as an IRS 501(c)(3) nonprofit organization by civic leaders of the City of Novi, Michigan, led by Founding Chairman Larry G. Ciancio.  Its inaugural Induction Ceremony was held in 1989.  Ron Watson was its founding President and continued to serve in that capacity until his untimely death in October 2019. He was succeeded as president at his request by noted motorsports author and historian and longtime MSHFA board member George Levy.

The mission of the MSHFA is to “further the American core values of leadership, creativity, originality, teamwork and spirit of competition embodied in motorsports.” The MSHFA is operated by the nonprofit Motorsports Museum and Hall of Fame of America Foundation Inc.

Induction

Induction process
Eligibility for induction is extended to "any person who has driven, piloted, owned, designed, built, supported, maintained, prepared or promoted motorized vehicles in pursuit of speed, distance or other records." An inductee must either be retired for at least three years, or engaged in the top level for their area of motorsports for at least 20 years. Induction is limited to United States citizens, or non-citizens who have recorded significant motorsports achievements in the U.S.

Induction is decided by a straight vote among 200 racing experts: historians, experienced journalists, category experts and existing inductees.  The voting process is overseen by certified accountants.

Every year there are two rounds of voting. The first is conducted among a 100-voter nominating committee to determine the six finalists in each category. The second, open to all 200 voters, decides that year's inductee in each category. Each inductee receives the Hall of Fame's prestigious “Horsepower” award — an original bronze statuette by renowned Ann Arbor, Michigan sculptor Michael Curtis. Curtis sculptures have been presented both to and by United States Presidents .

The inaugural Motorsports Hall of Fame of America class in 1989 featured Cannon Ball Baker (Motorcycles), James Doolittle (Aviation), A. J. Foyt (Open Wheel), Don Garlits (Drag Racing), Phil Hill (Sports Cars), Bill Muncey (Powerboats), Barney Oldfield (Historic) and Richard Petty (Stock Cars).

Induction ceremony
The annual Induction Ceremony is the MSHFA's premier event and takes place every March in Daytona Beach, Florida. The event incorporates motorsports legends past and present, just as it features new inductees on the main stage. Traditionally, each inductee is presented for induction by another prominent figure in the motorsports community. In 2019, multi-time champions Jimmie Johnson, Jack Beckman, Don Prudhomme and Scott Dixon, Indianapolis Motor Speedway President Doug Boles, former American Suzuki Vice President Mel Harris and automotive designer Peter Brock took the stage and presented Tony Stewart, Don Schumacher, Linda Vaughn, Dario Franchitti, Augie Duesenberg, Kevin Schwantz and Phil Remington respectively for induction at the black-tie ceremony.

The Class of 2020 includes Red Byron (Historic), Chris Carr (Motorcycles), Floyd Clymer (At Large), Wally Dallenbach (Open Wheel), Rick Hendrick (Stock Cars), Jacky Ickx (Sports Cars), Tiny Lund (Historic), “Ohio George” Montgomery (Drag Racing) and Ivan “Ironman” Stewart (Off-Road).
 
The two-day induction experience includes several other events as well, including the Heroes of Horsepower reception held in the MSHFA museum the night before the black-tie ceremony at which the new inductees unveil their permanent Hall of Fame sculptures. Additionally, the Heritage Luncheon spotlights the induction of the honorees in the Historic category.  The Inductee Breakfast allows the incoming class and returning Hall of Famers to open up in a lively Q&A session.  Admission to all events event is open to the public via tickets purchased in advance.

Museum

The Motorsports Hall of Fame of America museum on the grounds of Daytona International Speedway welcomes more than 100,000 visitors per year. The museum was originally located in Novi, MI, birthplace of the famous Novi Special Indianapolis 500 racecars.  It later moved to the Detroit Science Center before relocating to Daytona Beach. The museum is housed within the Ticket and Tours Building at Daytona International Speedway. Admission is open daily as part of regular speedway tours.

On display are vehicles and artifacts related to the Hall of Fame's inductees and achievements. Examples include historic racing vehicles, memorabilia, informational displays and plaques honoring the MSHFA's more than 260 inductees. There are also two movie theaters featuring motorsports content.

Research
The MSHFA also serves as a research organization, with a network of experts on motorsports topics. It fields a broad range of questions on motorsports topics from journalists, historians, researchers and individuals.

Reception
The Motorsports Hall of Fame of America's Induction Ceremony has been attended by major names in the motorsports world throughout its history. Recent Honorary chairmen have included Formula 1 CEO Chase Carey, 1978 Formula 1 World Champion Mario Andretti and 2004  NASCAR Cup Series Champion Kurt Busch.  Autoweek said of the 2019 induction, “Emceed by the best in the business, broadcaster, former driver and 2009 inductee David Hobbs... it was arguably the smoothest, best-run ceremony in the Motorsports Hall of Fame of America’s history.” The announcements of each new class of inductees are covered by TV outlets, magazines and websites, including ESPN, Forbes, INDYCAR, Autoweek, and Racer.

Other publications such as Autocar and Car and Driver have lauded the museum and its exhibits as an enthusiast destination.

Inductees

+ Person inducted under special rule.  Usually, an inductee must have been retired for at least three years in their field.  However, inductees may also have been engaged at the top level of his or her area of motorsports for at least 20 years, and if that is the case, the retirement rule is waived.

* Terry Vance and Byron Hines were inducted together as "Vance & Hines."

See also
International Motorsports Hall of Fame
Long Beach Motorsports Walk of Fame

References

External links
Official website

Automobile museums in Florida
Halls of fame in Florida
Auto racing museums and halls of fame
Motorsport in Daytona Beach, Florida
Museums in Daytona Beach, Florida
Former buildings and structures in Michigan
Museums established in 1986
1986 establishments in Michigan